Alan Harrison Berg (January 18, 1934 – June 18, 1984) was an American talk radio show host in Denver, Colorado. Born to a Jewish family, he had outspoken atheistic and liberal views and a confrontational interview style. Berg was murdered by members of the white supremacist group The Order, who believed in killing all Jews and sending all black people to Africa. Those involved in the killing were part of a group planning to kill prominent Jews such as Berg. Two of them, David Lane and neo-Nazi Bruce Pierce, were convicted on charges of civil rights violations, although neither was charged with murder. They were sentenced to 190 years and 252 years in prison, respectively.

Early life
Berg was a native of Chicago, Illinois. His family was Jewish. He attended the University of Colorado Denver before transferring to the University of Denver. At age 22, Berg was one of the youngest people to pass the Illinois state bar examination and he went into practice in Chicago. However, he began to experience neuromuscular seizures and had become an alcoholic. His then-wife, Judith Lee Berg (née Halpern), convinced him to quit his practice to seek help. They moved to Denver, her hometown, and he entered rehabilitation voluntarily. Although he completed his treatment, he continued to be plagued by seizures. He was ultimately diagnosed with a brain tumor. After it was surgically removed, he made a full recovery. For the rest of his life, Berg wore long bangs to hide the surgical scars.

Radio career
Berg worked at a shoe store and later opened a clothing store in Denver where he met KGMC talk show host Laurence Gross. Impressed with Berg, Gross made him a guest on several occasions. When Gross left KGMC to take a job in San Diego, California, he requested that Alan Berg be named his successor.

From KGMC, which changed its call sign to KWBZ, Berg moved to KHOW, also in Denver. After being fired from KHOW, Berg went back to KWBZ before it changed to an all-music format and he again lost his job. The unemployed Berg was courted by both KTOK in Oklahoma City, Oklahoma and Detroit, Michigan. He was hired by KOA (AM) and debuted on February 23, 1981. He worked at KOA until his death.

His program could be received in more than 30 states. Berg, who held liberal social and political views, became known for upsetting some callers to the point they began sputtering, whereupon he would berate them. Clarissa Pinkola Estés of the Moderate Voice website wrote in 2007: "He didn't pick on the poor, the frail, the undefended: He chose Roderick Elliot and Frank "Bud" Farell, who wrote The Death of the White Race and Open Letter to the Gentiles, and other people from the white supremacist groups... the groups who openly espoused hatred of blacks, Jews, leftists, homosexuals, Hispanics, other minorities and religious groups".

On March 5, 1982, Berg tried to interview Ellen Kaplan, a member of the LaRouche movement, about an incident that had happened on February 7, 1982, at the Newark International Airport. Kaplan had recognized Henry Kissinger, who was on his way to Boston to undergo a coronary artery bypass operation, shouted an abusive question at him ("Is it true that you sleep with young boys at The Carlyle Hotel?"), whereupon his wife Nancy attacked Kaplan. During his program, Berg called Kaplan on the phone. When she answered, he introduced her as “a vile human being” and praised Nancy Kissinger's attack on her. After Kaplan hung up, Berg continued to ridicule Kaplan and abuse her verbally for the remainder of the program. Afterwards, KOA received complaints by listeners and Kaplan's boyfriend, and on suggestion of the lawyers of the station owners General Electric, the station management suspended Berg from work for a few days. After returning to work, Berg toned down his methods somewhat.

Murder
At about 9:30 p.m. on June 18, 1984, Berg returned to his Adams Street townhouse after a dinner date with Judith, with whom he was attempting reconciliation. Berg stepped out of his black Volkswagen Beetle and gunfire erupted with Berg being shot twelve times. The murder weapon, a semi-automatic Ingram MAC-10, which had been illegally converted to an automatic weapon, was later traced to the home of one of The Order's members by the Federal Bureau of Investigation's Hostage Rescue Team.

A former producer of Berg's believed that he was on a "death list" both because he was Jewish and because he had challenged on air the beliefs of the Christian Identity movement that Jews are descended from Satan. At the trial for his murder, prosecutors contended that he was singled out for assassination because he was a Jew and because his personality incurred the anger of white supremacists. At the conspiracy trial of members of The Order, the white supremacist organization responsible for organizing the assassination, a founding member of the group, Denver Daw Parmenter, was asked why Berg was targeted. Parmenter responded that Berg "was mainly thought to be anti-white and he was Jewish". Berg's remains were buried at the Waldheim Jewish Cemetery in Forest Park, Illinois.

Four members of The Order, Jean Craig, David Lane, Bruce Pierce, and Richard Scutari, were indicted on federal charges. However, only Lane and Pierce were convicted, though neither of homicide. They were instead convicted of racketeering, conspiracy, and violating Berg's civil rights. Lane was sentenced to 190 years and Pierce was sentenced to 252 years.

Lane was a former Klansman who later joined the neo-Nazi Christian Identity group Aryan Nation. He steadfastly denied any involvement in Berg's murder, but neither did he regret that Berg was dead. In an interview presented as part of the History Channel documentary Nazi America: A Secret History, Lane admitted to calling the show and goading Berg into an exchange and stated: "The only thing I have to say about Alan Berg is, regardless of who did it, he has not mouthed his hate-whitey propaganda from his 50,000-watt zionist pulpit for quite a few years". 

Lane, incarcerated at the Federal Correctional Complex in Terre Haute, Indiana, died of an epileptic seizure at age 68 on May 28, 2007. Bruce Pierce, who was incarcerated at the Federal Correctional Complex in Union County, Pennsylvania, died of natural causes at age 56 on August 16, 2010. Craig and Scutari were convicted of unrelated crimes. The leader of The Order, Robert Jay Mathews, who was believed to have been a lookout in the Berg shooting although it was never proven, was burned to death during a standoff with federal authorities on December 8, 1984, at his home in Coupeville, Washington.

In popular culture
Steven Dietz's 1988 play God's Country and the 1988 film Betrayed were based on the incident, as was the film Brotherhood of Murder (1999). Director Oliver Stone's 1988 film adaptation of Eric Bogosian's play Talk Radio also drew inspiration from Berg's death. His life and death were chronicled in the book, Talked to Death: The Life and Murder of Alan Berg by Stephen Singular.

See also
List of journalists killed in the United States

References

External links
Alan Berg at the Internet Movie Database
Talk Radio Assassination!, WFMU website 1996
"Living Out Loud: Death of a Radiohead", Cincinnati CityBeat July 14, 2004
Judith Lee Berg, a profile of Alan Berg's widow

1934 births
1984 deaths
1984 murders in the United States
20th-century American lawyers
Jewish American journalists
American talk radio hosts
Antisemitic attacks and incidents in the United States
Assassinated American journalists
Assassinated Jews
Assassinated radio people
Deaths by firearm in Colorado
Illinois lawyers
Journalists killed in the United States
Lawyers from Chicago
Male murder victims
Murdered American Jews
Neo-fascist terrorist incidents in the United States
People murdered in Colorado
Political violence in the United States
Radio personalities from Denver
University of Colorado Denver alumni
University of Denver alumni
Victims of antisemitic violence
Victims of religiously motivated violence in the United States
Burials in Forest Park, Illinois
Shock jocks